Patrick Simmons is a politician from the island of Grenada. He previously served as that nation's Minister of Youth Empowerment, Culture and Sports.

References

Year of birth missing (living people)
Living people
Members of the House of Representatives of Grenada
Government ministers of Grenada
Place of birth missing (living people)